Chamberlain is an American indie rock band from Indianapolis and Bloomington, Indiana, United States, previously having been known as Split Lip.  They changed their name and their general sound away from post-hardcore punk in October 1995. The band split up in May 2000, but released several posthumous releases.

History
In 1995, Split Lip returned to Detroit to record "Fate's Got A Driver" and the summer of 1995 saw the band hit the road with Ohio's Colossus of the Fall and DC's Samuel. It was during this month-long outing that the decision came to change the name and the direction of the band. By October 1995, the band was already playing shows under the name Chamberlain. Moore and Rubenstein returned to the studio in late 1995 and re-recorded the vocals and re-mixed the album, and Chamberlain was born.

The band re-released the updated Fate's Got A Driver as Chamberlain in 1996, toured the US and Europe and took time out to record a new demo with acclaimed independent music producer Paul Mahern, much of which would go on to become The Moon My Saddle.  After much courting by numerous major labels, the band were due to sign for Revolution Records, an imprint of Warner Music Group, but a signing freeze just before putting pen to paper thwarted them.

The second Chamberlain studio album, "The Moon My Saddle," was recorded in the summer of 1998 at Echo Park Studios in Bloomington with producer Ray Martin and released later that year by Doghouse. The group continued performing for another two years, but without Snyder (briefly replaced by Stoll Vaughan, an intern at Echo Park during the recording of The Moon, My Saddle), Mead (replaced by Showermast/Red Devil, Blue Devil's Seth Greathouse) and Walker (replaced by Uvula's Wade Parish). During this time, a collection of demos recorded during rehearsals was compiled as their third album, Exit 263, and was released independently in 2000 through the band's management company, after being rejected from Doghouse. The band folded not long after that release, with members each going their separate ways and continuing to work on musical projects.

The double LP retrospective, Five-Year Diary (which is also the name of a song from Fate's Got A Driver) was released by the German label Hometown Caravan in 2002.  The album features live tracks and old demo recordings as well as tracks from compilations and hard to find releases.

Since 2009, the band has occasionally regrouped for live shows and tours. In 2019, the band announced that they were working on a new LP, "Red Weather" with My Morning Jacket's Carl Broemel as the producer, and released the first single, "Some Other Sky" in June 2019. 

The members have been involved with many different musical projects in New York City, Los Angeles and Indianapolis. Curtis Mead and Charlie Walker briefly played, together with former Brainiac bass player and video director Juan Monostereo and ex Bullet LaVolta/Juliana Hatfield drummer Todd Philips, in Model/Actress, which released an EP in 2008.

Reunion
On the heels of a mini-Chamberlain reunion at the 2008 South by Southwest festival that featured Moore, Rubenstein, Walker and Mead, The band reformed with Snyder in May 2009 for a series of shows culminating in the Burning Fight book release show in Chicago. The show celebrated the release of the '90s hardcore book of the same name released by Revelation Records. Aside from the Chicago date, two other shows were played in Louisville and Indianapolis in May, followed by a December performance at New York's Bowery Ballroom. Prior to these gigs, Snyder had not played with the band since 1998.

Chamberlain toured with The Gaslight Anthem and Tim Barry  in summer 2010, and performed at Krazy Fest 2011 in Louisville, Kentucky on May 20, 2011. An interview with Rubenstein in the July 2011 Alternative Press hinted at continued collaborations

In September, 2018 the band had a short tour to celebrate the 20th anniversary of its 1998 LP,'The Moon, My Saddle', and announced that they were collaborating on new music for the first time since 2010. 

June of 2019 saw Chamberlain return to Europe for the first time since 1996 with a string of dates culminating in an appearance at Hamburg's Booze Cruise festival.

Other members
Seth Greathouse – bass (1998–2000)
Wade Parish – drums (1999–2000)
Stoll Vaughan – guitar (1998–1999)

Post-Split Lip/Chamberlain Projects 
 Charlie Walker is a touring and session drummer in Nashville. His most notable work has been as a member of Institute alongside former Bush frontman Gavin Rossdale, and the bands Oslo, Samiam, and New End Original.
 Curtis Mead lives in Los Angeles, California and played bass for Little Wolverines and Model/Actress, in addition to being a touring member of Metroschifter and Hundred Reasons.  
 Adam Rubenstein released a solo album under the name "Adam Dove" on Hometown Caravan, followed by two solo LP's released under his own name on Arctic Rodeo
 David Moore's solo LP, "My Lover, My Stranger" was released by Doghouse Records in 2009.
 Adam Rubenstein and David Moore contributed a track to Doghouse Records' Bob Dylan tribute album

Discography

Albums
 Fate's Got A Driver (1995 · Doghouse Records) (1996 UK release For All The Right Reasons) (2009 special edition reissue Doghouse Records)
 The Moon My Saddle (1998 · Doghouse Records) (2011 re-release Topshelf Records)
 Exit 263 (2001 · South Bittersweet Lane Music)
 Five-Year Diary (2002 · Engineer Records)
 Red Weather (2020)

EPs
 Five Year Diary (1995, Doghouse Records/For All The Right Reasons)
 Her Side Of Sundown (1995, Doghouse Records/For All The Right Reasons)
 Chamberlain/Old Pike Split (1996, Doghouse Records)
 Go Down Believing (1998, Doghouse Records)
 Doghouse Fan Series (2001, Doghouse Records)
 Raise it High (2010, The Blackcloud Label, reissued 2010, 2019 Arctic Rodeo)
 Some Other Sky (2019, Arctic Rodeo)

References

External links
 
 Interview with David Moore from 2000

Indie rock musical groups from Indiana
Musical groups from Indianapolis
Straight edge groups
Topshelf Records artists
Doghouse Records artists